DiMatteo Vineyards is a winery located in Hammonton in Atlantic County, New Jersey. Formerly a family produce farm, the vineyard was first planted in 2000, and opened to the public in 2002. In 2010, the winery moved its headquarters to a new location in Hammonton. DiMatteo has 14 acres of grapes under cultivation, and produces 1,500 cases of wine per year. The winery is named after the family that owns it.

Wines
DiMatteo Vineyards is in the Outer Coastal Plain AVA, and produces wine from Cabernet Franc, Cayuga White, Chambourcin, Chancellor, Chardonnay, Concord, Diamond, Ives noir, Merlot, Niagara, Syrah, Traminette, and Vidal blanc grapes. DiMatteo also makes fruit wines from apples, blueberries, cranberries, peaches, pumpkins, and strawberries. It is the only winery in New Jersey that produces wine from Diamond, which is a white hybrid grape developed in New York in the 1880s.

Licensing and associations
DiMatteo has a farm winery license from the New Jersey Division of Alcoholic Beverage Control, which allows it to produce up to 50,000 gallons of wine per year, operate up to 15 off-premises sales rooms, and ship up to 12 cases per year to consumers in-state or out-of-state. The winery is a member of the Garden State Wine Growers Association and the Outer Coastal Plain Vineyard Association.

See also
Alcohol laws of New Jersey
American wine
Judgment of Princeton
List of wineries, breweries, and distilleries in New Jersey
New Jersey Farm Winery Act
New Jersey Wine Industry Advisory Council
New Jersey wine

References

External links
Garden State Wine Growers Association
Outer Coastal Plain Vineyard Association

Wineries in New Jersey
Tourist attractions in Atlantic County, New Jersey
Hammonton, New Jersey
2005 establishments in New Jersey